And Then There Were None is a 1945 film adaptation of Agatha Christie's 1939 mystery novel of the same name, directed by René Clair. It was released in the United Kingdom as Ten Little Indians, in keeping with the third United Kingdom title of Christie's novel.

Plot
Ten people, all strangers to each other, are invited to a small isolated island off the coast of Devon, England, by a Mr. and Mrs. Owen. They settle in at a mansion tended by two newly hired servants, Thomas and Ethel Rogers, but their hosts are absent. When the guests sit down to dinner, they notice the centerpiece, ten figurines of Indians. Thomas puts on a gramophone record, through which a man's voice accuses them all of murder:
 General Sir John Mandrake, of ordering his wife's lover, a lieutenant under his command, to his death
 Emily Brent, of the death of her young nephew
 Dr. Edward G. Armstrong, of drunkenness which resulted in a patient dying
 Prince Nikita Starloff, of killing a couple while speeding
 Vera Claythorne, of murdering her sister's fiancé
 Judge Francis J. Quinncannon, of being responsible for the hanging of an innocent man
 Philip Lombard, of killing 21 South African tribesmen
 William H. Blore, of perjury, resulting in an innocent man's death
 Thomas and Ethel Rogers, of the demise of their previous employer, an invalid

It becomes apparent that none of the ten knows or has even seen "U. N. Owen"; they then realize the name stands for "unknown." They also cannot leave the island, as Rogers informs them that the boat will not return until Monday, and it is only Friday.

Starloff admits his guilt, then dies from his drink, which was poisoned. The next morning, it is discovered that Mrs. Rogers died in her sleep. The guests notice that one figurine is broken and another missing after the two deaths. With the two deaths matching the Ten Little Indians nursery rhyme, they search the island for "Mr. Owen" without success. After General Mandrake is stabbed to death, the judge declares that Owen must be one of them.

They vote on who they suspect Owen is; as the only one to get more than one vote, Rogers is made to sleep in the woodshed. The next morning, they find him dead, his head split open with an axe. Miss Brent dies next, her body found with a hypodermic needle nearby. Armstrong discovers that his needle is missing and Lombard's revolver is lost as well.

At dinner, Quinncannon, Armstrong, Blore, and Lombard all confess to their crimes. When it is Miss Claythorne's turn, she excuses herself to get her coat and the others hear her shriek and rush to her. In the confusion, a single gunshot is heard. They find her shaken after being brushed by seaweed hanging from the ceiling. They also find Lombard's gun; Quinncannon is dead from a shot to the head.

Miss Claythorne insists she is innocent, but Armstrong suspects her and locks her in her room. That night, Claythorne admits to Lombard that her sister killed her own fiancé, and that Claythorne helped her cover up the crime and took the blame. The two later realize Armstrong is missing.

The next morning, Blore is struck by stonework toppled from the floor above. Lombard sees a corpse on the beach: Armstrong. Miss Claythorne holds Lombard's gun against him, certain that Lombard is the killer. He tells her that his real name is Charles Morley, and that the real Lombard was his friend who committed suicide. Morley has a flash of insight and urges her to shoot him.

Miss Claythorne fires and Morley drops. She finds a noose hanging in the parlor and discovers who Owen is: Quinncannon, very much alive. The judge tells her that all his life he had searched for perfect justice. After learning that he was terminally ill, he concocted this plan. He persuaded Armstrong to help him fake his own (Quinncannon's) death, supposedly to help catch Owen, then murdered Armstrong. He tells her that she can either hang herself or be sent to the gallows (as the only possible perpetrator). He drinks poisoned whiskey, while Morley appears behind him, alive, as Vera had purposely missed shooting him. Quinncannon dies and the boat arrives, rescuing Morley and Miss Claythorne.

Cast

The cast included:
 Barry Fitzgerald as Judge Francis J. Quinncannon
 Walter Huston as Dr. Edward G. Armstrong
 Louis Hayward as Philip Lombard/Charles Morley
 Roland Young as Detective William Henry Blore
 June Duprez as Vera Claythorne
 Mischa Auer as Prince Nikita "Nikki" Starloff
 C. Aubrey Smith as General Sir John Mandrake
 Judith Anderson as Emily Brent
 Richard Haydn as Thomas Rogers
 Queenie Leonard as Ethel Rogers
 Harry Thurston as Fred Narracott

Reception
On first release in 1945, Bosley Crowther of The New York Times wrote: "René Clair has produced an exciting film and has directed a splendid cast in it with humor and a light macabre touch. The temptation to the horrifying is intelligently dismissed". The film kept its audience involved "from fear and trembling, not from gore." Several performances were commended, especially Walter Huston and Barry Fitzgerald. Variety magazine, however, described the film as a "dull whodunit" which "rarely rises to moments of suspense and despite the killings it gives the appearance of nothing ever happening". Most of the cast, Variety thought, seemed out of place.

Film critic Leonard Maltin awarded the film four out of four stars, calling it "Highly suspenseful" and praising the film's script, music score, and visuals.

Awards
The film won the Golden Leopard and the Best Direction Award at the 1946 Locarno International Film Festival.

Distribution and copyright
Though it was distributed by a major studio, 20th Century Fox, the copyright was allowed to lapse and the film is now in the public domain.  Several different editions of varying quality have been released to home video formats.

The name of the film sometimes varies with who listed it. In 1960, Radio Times altered the title to Ten Little Niggers for an airing of Clair's film on BBC television on 9 July, the original title of the novel as published in the UK.

Sensitivity to the original title of the novel was remarked by Sadie Stein in 2016, commenting on a BBC miniseries with the title And Then There Were None, which she said "has been an enormous hit in the UK." In general, "Christie’s work is not known for its racial sensitivity, and by modern standards her oeuvre is rife with casual Orientalism." The original title was based on a rhyme from minstrel shows and children's games, "a rhyme so macabre and distressing one doesn’t hear it now outside of the Agatha Christie context." Stein quotes Alison Light as to the power of the original name of the island in the novel, Nigger Island, "to conjure up a thrilling ‘otherness’, a place where revelations about the ‘dark side’ of the English would be appropriate." Speaking of the "widely known" 1945 movie, Stein added that "we’re merely faced with fantastic amounts of violence, and a rhyme so macabre and distressing one doesn’t hear it now outside of the Agatha Christie context." She felt that the original title of the novel in the UK, seen now, "that original title, it jars, viscerally."

Later film versions
Multiple versions of Christie's mystery have been filmed, including Ten Little Indians (1965), Ten Little Indians (1974), Desyat Negrityat (1987), and Ten Little Indians (1989).

See also
 List of films in the public domain in the United States

References

External links

 
 
 
 
 

1945 films
1945 mystery films
American mystery films
20th Century Fox films
American black-and-white films
1940s English-language films
Films based on And Then There Were None
Films directed by René Clair
Films set in country houses
Films set in Devon
Films set on islands
Golden Leopard winners
Films with screenplays by Dudley Nichols
Films scored by Mario Castelnuovo-Tedesco
1940s American films